Cristian Bocșan (born 31 January 1995) is a Romanian professional footballer who plays as a central defender for SSU Politehnica Timișoara in the Liga II.

Club career
After playing coming through the junior ranks and playing for the club in the second league, Bocșan made his debut in the Romanian Liga I in the 2015-2016 season, in an away match against CFR Cluj.

Honours

ACS Poli Timișoara
Liga II: 2014–15

References

External links
 
 

1995 births
Living people
Sportspeople from Timișoara
Romanian footballers
Association football defenders
Liga I players
Liga II players
ACS Poli Timișoara players
FC Ripensia Timișoara players
SSU Politehnica Timișoara players